Pelasgus epiroticus, or tsima, is a species of freshwater minnow in the family Cyprinidae.
It is endemic to lake Pamvotis in Greece. Due to the restricted range of the species as well as the significant loss its population suffered since the early 1990s it has been assessed as critically endangered by the International Union for Conservation of Nature (IUCN).

References

Pelasgus (fish)
Endemic fauna of Greece
Cyprinid fish of Europe
Taxa named by Franz Steindachner
Fish described in 1895
Taxonomy articles created by Polbot